Yevhen Dmytrovych Zaporozhets (born 20 September 1994) is a Ukrainian professional footballer who plays as a midfielder for Inhulets Petrove.

Club career 
He is a product of the youth system of ISTA from Dnipro. Zaporozhets made his debut for Dnipropetrovsk at regional competitions in Dnipropetrovsk Oblast in 2013. In 2014 he joined AF Pyatykhatska Volodymyrivka which later became Inhulets Petrove.

Career statistics

References

External links
 
 
 

1994 births
Living people
Footballers from Dnipro
Ukrainian footballers
Association football midfielders
FC Inhulets Petrove players
FC Inhulets-2 Petrove players
FC Inhulets-3 Petrove players
Ukrainian Premier League players
Ukrainian First League players
Ukrainian Second League players
Ukrainian Amateur Football Championship players